Bursea is a hamlet in the East Riding of Yorkshire, England. It lies to the north of the River Foulness.
Bursea forms part of the civil parish of Holme-on-Spalding-Moor.

The chapel at Bursea is designated a Grade II listed building in August 1987 and is now recorded in the National Heritage List for England, maintained by Historic England.

References

Villages in the East Riding of Yorkshire